Ivan Lunardi (born 15 May 1973) is an Italian former ski jumper.

Career
At the 1992 Winter Olympics in Albertville, he finished seventh in the individual large hill event. Lunardi's best individual finish at the FIS Nordic World Ski Championships was fourth in the normal hill event at Falun in 1993. His best finish at the Ski-flying World Championships was ninth at Harrachov in 1992.

Lunardi's only World Cup victory was in a large hill event in Finland in 1993.

World Cup

Standings

Wins

External links

1973 births
Ski jumpers at the 1992 Winter Olympics
Ski jumpers at the 1994 Winter Olympics
Italian male ski jumpers
Living people
People from Asiago
Sportspeople from the Province of Vicenza